Ramin Azizov (born 8 February 1988, in Lankaran) is an Azerbaijani taekwondo practitioner. He received a gold medal at the 2011 World Taekwondo Olympic Qualification Tournament, held in his home country, and qualified for the 2012 Summer Olympics in the -80 kg division.  At the 2012 Summer Olympics he won his first match against Steven López, before losing to Mauro Sarmiento in the quarterfinals.

References 

Azerbaijani male taekwondo practitioners
1988 births
Living people
People from Lankaran
Olympic taekwondo practitioners of Azerbaijan
Taekwondo practitioners at the 2012 Summer Olympics
European Taekwondo Championships medalists
World Taekwondo Championships medalists
Islamic Solidarity Games competitors for Azerbaijan
Islamic Solidarity Games medalists in taekwondo
20th-century Azerbaijani people